The 1985 Individual Speedway World Championship was the 40th edition of the official World Championship to determine the world champion rider.

Odsal Stadium, the new home of international speedway in England after the demise of the Wembley Stadium and White City Stadium tracks, was chosen by the FIM to host the 1985 Final on 31 August 1985; the first time that the final had been held in England at a venue other than Wembley.

A crowd of around 30,000 attended the 1985 Final, which was won by defending champion Erik Gundersen of Denmark from fellow Dane Hans Nielsen and surprise third placing Sam Ermolenko of the United States. All three riders finished the meeting on 13 points and were forced into a run-off to decide the podium placings. The only English rider in the field, 21-year-old Kelvin Tatum, finished 8th with 8 points in his first World Final. He won his first race, but later admitted that he let the occasion get to him which affected his riding.

British Qualification

British Final
6 June 1985
 Coventry, Brandon Stadium
First 7 to Overseas final plus 1 reserve

Swedish Qualification

Australian Qualification

Australian Final
5 January 1985
 Ayr
First 2 to Overseas final

Intercontinental Round

Norwegian Final

1 May 1985
 Elgane
First to Nordic final

Danish Final

5 May 1985
 Brovst
First 7 to Nordic final

American Final
8 June 1985
 Long Beach, Veterans Memorial Stadium
First 5 to Overseas final

Nordic Final

 9 June 1985
 Fjelsted
First 6 to Intercontinental final plus 1 reserve 
Kai Niemi, Ari Koponen and Olli Tyrväinen seeded direct to the Nordic Final

Overseas Final
 14 July 1985
  Bradford, Odsal Stadium
 First 10 to the Intercontinental Final plus 1 reserve
 David Bargh seeded direct to Overseas Final by the New Zealand Auto Cycle Union

Intercontinental Final

 3 August 1985
  Vetlanda, Vetlanda Speedway
 First 11 plus one reserve to the World Final

Continental Round

Continental Final
 21 July 1985
  Pocking, Rottalstadion
 First 5 plus one reserve to the World Final

World Final
31 August 1985
 Bradford, Odsal Stadium
 Referee: Torrie Kittlesen

References

1985
Individual Speedway
Individual Speedway
Speedway competitions in the United Kingdom